The Thames Valley Cricket League is a mostly amateur cricket league, catering to clubs geographically to the west of London, with clubs coming from Berkshire, Buckinghamshire, Hampshire, Hertfordshire, Middlesex, Oxfordshire and Surrey, though most are from Berkshire and Buckinghamshire. The league, once the top level of amateur cricket in the area, has become a feeder league for the Home Counties Premier Cricket League since the creation of the Premier League, however the standard of the league is considered to be high, evidenced by the proliferation of Thames Valley League sides in the Premier Leagues, as well as the large uptake of expansion places in the league.

Format
The league is played on Saturday afternoons, and the matches are 100 overs in length. The side batting first can bat for a maximum of 52 overs, and the chasing team can use all overs not used by them. In Divisions 8 and 9, the matches are 90 overs on length with the side batting first allowed a maximum of 47 overs. Points are awarded as follows:
 25 points for a win
 2 points for scoring 100 runs, and 2 more for every 25 runs after that up to 200. In the second innings this is 1 point.
 1 point for taking 2 wickets, up to a maximum of 5 points for bowling the opposition out.
 7 points for a rained-off match
 15 points for a tie

Note that no bonus points are awarded to the winning team.

Winners

Member Clubs

References

Sources
 http://www.tvlcricket.com/
 https://archive.today/20130131150034/http://thamesvalleycl.play-cricket.com/home/home.asp
 Thames Valley Cricket League Handbook
 https://web.archive.org/web/20110724213920/http://www.homecountiescricket.com/constitution.asp
 https://archive.today/20130119025213/http://www.christopher-chandler.com/BNHCC/
 http://www.getbracknell.co.uk/sport/cricket/s/2077903_thames_valley_cricket_league_roundup
 http://www.getreading.co.uk/sport/cricket/s/2075987_flynns_on_fire_in_thames_valley_cricket_league
 https://cricketarchive.com/Archive/Seasons/ENG/2011_ENG_Thames_Valley_Cricket_League_Division_One_2011.html 

English domestic cricket competitions